Rhipicephalus hoogstraali is a tick found in Djibouti and Somalia. First recognized by Harry Hoogstraal as Rhipicephalus longicoxatus based on an incomplete published description, after discovery of the holotype of R. longicoxatus, it was described and named to honor Hoogstraal in 2009.

The specific epithet is not universally accepted as valid, because the species was not described according to the accepted rules of the International Code of Zoological Nomenclature.

Hosts
Rhipicephalus hoogstraali parasitizes sheep, goats, camels and cattle.

See also
Ticks of domestic animals

References

Ticks
Animals described in 2009
Endemic fauna of Djibouti
Ixodidae
Nomina nuda